Utikoomak Lake 155B is an Indian reserve of the Whitefish Lake First Nation in Alberta, located within Northern Sunrise County.

References

Indian reserves in Alberta
Whitefish Lake First Nation